The Rosalinda gerbil (Gerbillus rosalinda) is distributed mainly central Sudan.

References

  Database entry includes a brief justification of why this species is listed as data deficient

Gerbillus
Rodents of Africa
Mammals described in 1929